Pascal Tosi (25 April 1837 – 14 January 1898) was an Italian Jesuit, missionary and co-founder of the Alaska mission and Church.

Biography
Tosi was born on 25 April 1837 in Santarcangelo di Romagna, Italy. He was one of the first two Jesuits missionaries (the other being Louis Robaut) to set foot in Alaska. As the first Superior of Jesuits in Alaska (from 1886 to 1897) and first to have ecclesiastical jurisdiction in Alaska (Prefect Apostolic from 1894 to 1897), he is regarded as the founder and organizer of the Church in North-Alaska.
   
Ordained a (diocesan) priest in 1861, Tosi entered the Jesuits the following year in order to be sent to the 'American mission'. In 1865 he arrived in the United States to serve on the Rocky Mountain Mission. For two decades he proved to be an able missionary to the Indigenous Peoples of the American Northwest.

When in 1886 Archbishop Charles John Seghers set out for northern Alaska on what was meant to be a reconnaissance expedition, he had with him as travelling companions Pascal Tosi and French Jesuit, Louis Robaut. The two were supposed to stay with the archbishop only on a temporary basis.  The Jesuits had no intentions at the time of opening a new field of missionary activity in Alaska. However, the murder of Archbishop Seghers  (November 1886) changed the situation, and their thinking on the matter.

Tosi and Robaut spent the winter of 1886-87 in Canada at the confluence of the Yukon and Stewart Rivers. When in early 1887, upon entering Alaska, they learned of the death of Archbishop Seghers, Tosi considered himself to be in charge, at least for the time being, of ecclesiastical affairs in Alaska. The following Summer he made a trip to the Pacific Northwest to consult with the Superior of the Rocky Mountain Mission, Joseph M. Cataldo, who formally appointed him Superior of the Alaska Mission and entrusted him with the task of developing that mission.

In 1892, he made a trip to Rome. There Pope Leo XIII, moved by Fr. Tosi's account of the state of the mission in Alaska, told him in their native Italian, Andate, fate voi da papa in quelle regioni! ("Go and make yourself the Pope in those regions!").

On July 27, 1894, the Holy See separated Alaska from the Diocese of Vancouver Island and made it a Prefecture Apostolic with Tosi as its Apostolic Prefect.

By 1897, Tosi was physically worn out by a tough daily life and strenuous labours in an extreme climate. He was succeeded both as Superior of the Alaska Mission and as Prefect Apostolic in March of that year by French Jesuit Jean-Baptiste René (1841-1916).

On September 13, 1897, Tosi sailed reluctantly from St. Michael, Alaska. As the ship left the harbour, a salute of four guns was ordered as a manifestation of the universal esteem in which he was held. He had hoped to stay on in northern Alaska, for what actually turned out to be a brief retirement in Juneau as he died in Juneau on January 14, 1898.

Bibliography
 LLORENTE, S.: Jesuits in Alaska, Portland, 1969.
 TESTORE, C.: Nella terra del sole a mezzanotte. La fondazione delle missione di Alaska. P. Pasquale Tosi S.J., Venice, 1935.
 ZAVATTI, S., Missionario ed esploratore  nell'Alaska: Padre Pasquale Tosi, S.I., Milan, 1950.

References

1837 births
1897 deaths
Apostolic prefects of Alaska
Christian missionaries in Alaska
Italian emigrants to the United States
19th-century Italian Jesuits
Italian Roman Catholic missionaries
Jesuit missionaries in the United States
19th-century American Roman Catholic priests